Swamimalai is a panchayat town that is a suburb near Kumbakonam in Thanjavur District in the Indian state of Tamil Nadu. It lies on the banks of river Kaveri and is one of the six abodes of the Lord Muruga.

History
The town has one of the six abodes of Karthikeya and the temple is fourth among the Padai Veedugal. According to Hindu mythology, Karthikeya explains the meaning of pranavam to His father Lord Shiva at Swamimalai.  Hence, one can see the Karthikeya depicted as Guru (teacher) and Shiva listening as shishya (disciple) in the gopuram of the temple complex. The God is given by the name Swaminathan and Thagapan Swami (literally God of Father).

Geography
It has an average elevation of 25 metres (82 feet).

Topography 
It lies on the banks of river Kaveri

Demographics

Population  
 India census, Swamimalai had a population of 6985. Males constitute 49% of the population and females 51%. Swamimalai has an average literacy rate of 75%, higher than the national average of 59.5%: male literacy is 80%, and female literacy is 70%. In Swamimalai, 11% of the population is under 6 years of age.

Government and politics  
It is a panchayat town that is a suburb near Kumbakonam in Thanjavur District.

Culture

Art and handicrafts 
Swamimalai Bronze Icons refers to bronze idols and statues manufactured in Swamimalai. It has been recognized as a Geographical indication by the Government of India in 2008–09. During the reign of Chola empire, Raja Raja I commissioned a group of sculptors for the construction of the Brihadeeswarar Temple at Thanjavur. The sculptors helped sculpt statues for Airavatesvara Temple and later settled at Swamimalai.

References

Cities and towns in Thanjavur district